Andranik Voskanyan (born 11 April 1990), is an Armenian football player who plays as a defender.

Club career
Andranik Voskanyan loved football from early childhood. When he was in the first grade, a football coach visited looking for children interested in playing football. Voskanyan did not miss the opportunity and started to go to training. He began his career in the football school of Malatia Yerevan (now school property of Banants Yerevan) under the direction of Hakob Andreasyan.

He started playing for Mika-2 in the Armenian First League in 2008. Two years later, Voskanyan made his debut for the first team Mika Yerevan in the Armenian Premier League. He played three games that year. In 2011, he got a starter position in the defense and was a major player that season. In the 2011–12 UEFA Europa League, Mika had a match against Norwegian club Vålerenga Fotball. Voskanyan did not play on the field and remained at the touch-lines.

Voskanyan was released by FC Urartu on 5 December 2019.

On 5 January 2023, Voskanyan left Alashkert after his contract was terminated by mutual consent.

International career
In 2011, the chief coach of the Armenia national team saw Voskanyan's skills and recruited him in the Armenia U-21 youth team. On June 7 the same year, he made his debut for the youth national team in the qualifying matches for the 2013 UEFA European Under-21 Football Championship. His debut came in the opening match against the Montenegro U-21 youth team, which the Armenian youth team dealt a crushing defeat to 4-1. He played 5 games as a youth, all in 2011.

On February 28, 2012, he made his debut in the Armenia national football team in a friendly match against Serbia. Voskanyan played on the field in the 77th minute of the match, replacing Varazdat Haroyan. The match ended in defeat for Armenia 0-2.

Honours

Club
Pyunik Yerevan
Armenian Premier League Runner-up (1): 2009
Armenian Cup (1): 2011
Armenian Supercup (1): 2012-13

References

External links

1990 births
Living people
Footballers from Yerevan
Armenian footballers
Association football midfielders
Armenia international footballers
FC Mika players
FC Alashkert players
FC Urartu players
FC Van players
Armenian Premier League players